Ch'iyar Jaqhi (Aymara ch'iyara black, jaqhi precipice, cliff, "black cliff", Hispanicized spelling Chiaraque) is a mountain in the Peruvian Andes, about  high. It is located in the Moquegua Region, Mariscal Nieto Province, Carumas District. Ch'iyar Jaqhi lies west of the mountain Q'iwiri and southeast of Pinkilluni.

References

Mountains of Moquegua Region
Mountains of Peru